Apterichtus australis, the snake eel or South Pacific snake eel, is a species of snake eel native to the south Pacific Ocean where it occurs around the island groups of Rapa Iti, Pitcairn, Easter and the Kermadecs. It can be found at depths of from   inhabiting sandy areas near rocks or coral reefs. This species can reach a length of  TL.

Etymology
The species epithet "australis" refers to this species' southern (Latin australis) distribution.

References

australis
Fish described in 2005